Flóra Pásztor (born 30 June 1998) is a Hungarian fencer. She competed in the women's foil event at the 2020 Summer Olympics in Tokyo, Japan.

She competed at the 2022 World Fencing Championships held in Cairo, Egypt.

References

External links 
 

Living people
1998 births
Fencers from Budapest
Hungarian female foil fencers
European Games competitors for Hungary
Fencers at the 2014 Summer Youth Olympics
Fencers at the 2015 European Games
Fencers at the 2020 Summer Olympics
Olympic fencers of Hungary
21st-century Hungarian women